Alexander "Sandy" Whitelaw (28 April 1930 – 20 February 2015) was a British actor, producer, director and subtitler.

Early life
Whitelaw was born in London and educated in Switzerland, the UK and the United States. He represented Britain as a skier in the 1956 Olympics.

Filmmaking career
Whitelaw's film career began when he worked as an assistant to the producer David O. Selznick on the 1957 film A Farewell to Arms. He also worked for the production company Hecht-Lancaster. He went on to work for United Artists in a number of capacities, including as head of production for UA Europe.

At this time he was based in London and worked on films including Bernardo Bertolucci’s Last Tango in Paris (1972), Federico Fellini’s Roma (1972) and Pier Paolo Pasolini’s The Decameron (1971). He directed two films: Lifespan (1974), which starred Klaus Kinski, and Vicious Circles (1997), which starred Ben Gazzara. He acted in a number of films including The American Friend (1977), Broken English (1981) and The Beat That My Heart Skipped (2005).

Whitelaw began to work as a subtitler in the 1970s in Paris. It was the producer Pierre Cottrell who suggested that he subtitle Jean Eustache's film Mes petites amoureuses. He continued to work as a subtitler for four decades.

Films subtitled
Whitelaw provided English subtitles for more than 1,000 films over a period of several decades. He once called it "like getting paid to do crosswords". One of the more challenging jobs he took on was the subtitling, with Stephen O'Shea, of Mathieu Kassovitz's 1995 film La Haine. Their subtitles for this film received considerable critical attention.

Notable titles subtitled by Whitelaw include:

Mes petites amoureuses (Eustache, 1974)
Pauline at the Beach (Rohmer, 1983)
Danton (Wajda, 1983)
Shoah (Lanzmann, 1985)
La Haine (Kassovitz, 1995)
Heading South (Cantet, 2005)
Quai d'Orsay (Tavernier, 2013)

Filmography

References

External links
David Thompson, Sandy Whitelaw obituary, The Guardian, 24 March 2015 
Cheryl Cheng, Sandy Whitelaw obituary, The Hollywood Reporter, 23 April 2015

Alan Riding, "A Raw French Film Survives Translation", New York Times, 4 February 1996

2015 deaths
1930 births
British film directors
British male film actors
British film producers
British subtitlers
British male alpine skiers
Olympic alpine skiers of Great Britain
Alpine skiers at the 1956 Winter Olympics
20th-century British translators